Sunday Muse is a Canadian actress.

Biography
Sunday Muse is a voice actress. She launched "GreatBigVoices.com", as a way to share everything she gained as a voice actress.

Filmography
 Rolie Polie Olie (1999–2004) as Binky/Bogey Bot
 Mega Man Legends 2 (2000) as Shu
 Undergrads (2001)
 Rescue Heroes: The Movie (2003) as Mom
 Franny's Feet (2003) as Li-Mei
 Care Bears: Journey to Joke-a-lot (2004) as Cheer Bear
 JoJo's Circus (2004)
 Arthur (2004)
 The Care Bears' Big Wish Movie (2005) as Cheer Bear
 Time Warp Trio (2005–2006) as Fredricka "Freddi"
 6teen (2005) as Marlowe
 Jane and the Dragon (2006) as Pepper
 Odd Job Jack (2007)
 The Future Is Wild (2007)
 Bakugan Battle Brawlers (2008–2009)
 Willa's Wild Life (2008–2013) as Kara
 Jimmy Two-Shoes (2009–2012) as  Saffi
 The Cat in the Hat Knows a Lot About That! (2011) 
 Total Drama: Pahkitew Island (2014) as Ella
 Total DramaRama (2020) as Ella

References

External links
 Official Website
 
 
 

Living people
Canadian voice actresses
Canadian television actresses
Canadian film actresses
Year of birth missing (living people)